National Highway 38 (NH 38) is a  National Highway in India. This highway runs entirely in the state of Tamil Nadu.

The National Highway NH-38 originates from Vellore and terminates at Thoothukudi. It passes through the major cities of Tamilnadu.  The cities and towns includes ( from Vellore to Thoothukudi) Polur, Tiruvannamalai, Villupuram, Ulundurpettai, Perambalur, Trichy, Melur, Madurai, Aruppukottai, Ettayapuram.

References

External links
NH 38 on OpenStreetMap

National highways in India
National Highways in Tamil Nadu
Transport in Vellore
Transport in Thoothukudi